Randall "Randy" Lamar Howard (May 9, 1950 – June 9, 2015) was an American singer,  songwriter, guitarist, publisher and producer. His music involved Outlaw country, Traditional country, Old Southern gospel, Blues and Christian Country.

Early life
Randy Howard was born May 9, 1950 in Macon, Georgia.

Career
Howard worked as a disk jockey and program director at WDEN radio in Macon, Georgia.  He also appeared on television.  He formed the company Utopian Enterprises in 1973 and produced a number of records.

As a recording artist, Howard released seven albums and CDs, all of which have charted in both national and international trade magazines. His album All American Redneck was listed in BillBoard's Top Album Picks in 1983.

As a writer, Howard's songs were recorded by The Geezinslaw Brothers, Robin Lee and Hank Williams III.

Hank Williams III's CD Straight to Hell features Randy Howard's song entitled "My Drinkin' Problem"  which Stephen King, as Pop of King, included in his TOP 10 MUSIC PICKS A~LIST in Entertainment Weekly.

Howard appeared on Nashville Now, Entertainment Tonight, Good Morning America and USA Today.

On June 9, 2015, Howard was shot and killed at his home in Lynchburg, Tennessee during an altercation with bounty hunter Jackie Shell.

Discography
 All American Redneck, Warner Brothers. 
 Now & Then, Utopian Label
 Not Plugged In, Utopian Label
 Randy Howard, Atlantic Records
 Macon Music, Hitsound,{Europe}
 Randy Howard Live, Paul Hornsby and Randy Howard
 The Best of Randy Howard, Paul Hornsby and Randy Howard
 “ A Pair Of Knees”, Randy Howard and Paul Hornsby. CD released 2017 posthumous by the estate of Randy Howard

References

American country singers
American country songwriters
Country musicians from Georgia (U.S. state)
1950 births
2015 deaths